The Spokane area may refer to:

The Spokane–Coeur d'Alene combined statistical area
The Spokane metropolitan area
The Spokane, WA—ID urban area